= High Profits =

2015 documentary television series

Release
- Original network: CNN
- Original release: April 19, 2015

High Profits is an eight-part CNN documentary television series about Breckenridge Cannabis Club and the U.S. state of Colorado's legal cannabis industry. The series began airing on April 19, 2015.
